

Samuel Gerrish (1680s–1741) was a bookseller and publisher in Boston, Massachusetts, in the 18th century. He kept a shop "near the brick meeting house in Cornhill," and published works by Thomas Prince and others. Employees included Thomas Hancock.

Family
He married Mary Sewall (daughter of Samuel Sewall) in 1709; children included Samuel Gerrish (d.1751).

See also
 List of booksellers in Boston

References

Further reading

Published by Gerrish
 Thomas Prince. Annals of the New England Colonies.
 Cotton Mather. A vindication of the ministers of Boston: from the abuses & scandals, lately cast upon them, in diverse printed papers. (1722)

About Gerrish
  
 

Businesspeople from Boston
18th century in Boston
Bookstores in Boston
American publishers (people)
1680s births
1741 deaths